Mikael Temrowski (born May 6, 1992), known by his stage name Quinn XCII (pronounced "Quinn ninety-two"), is an American singer-songwriter from Detroit, Michigan. He began his career in 2011 when he started writing and recording his own music as a sophomore at Michigan State University, before releasing his debut EP Change of Scenery in May 2015. On September 15, 2017, he released his debut studio album The Story of Us under Columbia Records,  with whom he would release his second, third, and fourth albums, all in the following four years. On January 27, 2023, he released his fifth studio album, The People’s Champ.

Early life
Mikael Temrowski was born on May 6, 1992 in Grosse Pointe, Michigan. He grew up listening to the city's Motown musical history.

He met his primary producer and close friend Ayokay in third grade of elementary school and remained close friends throughout high school. Temrowski began attending college at Michigan State University, where he took an interest in writing and recording music as a sophomore.

Career

2011–2016: Early career and EPs
Temrowski originally went by the stage name "Mike T" and started performing and uploading videos to the video-sharing website YouTube. In college, he adopted the name Quinn based on an acronym used by a professor: "Quit Unless Your Instincts Are Never Neglected." Because of trademark issues, he later added the Roman numeral for 92, the year of his birth. He rapped over beats sampled from popular songs before releasing his own original song, "They Know" in 2011, followed by his first extended play Old Fashioned on November 5, 2012. During his attendance at Michigan State University around 2014, Temrowski started taking a more serious interest in writing and recording music. His longtime friend and producer, who goes by the stage name Ayokay, began producing music together, with Quinn XCII rapping over beats Ayokay found off of YouTube. Quinn XCII quickly became a college mixtape sensation, and would begin to travel frequently to Ann Arbor to record new music with Ayokay.

During May 2015, Quinn XCII released his debut extended play titled Change of Scenery, which garnered millions of online streams. His next single, "Stung", climbed to the #1 position on Hype Machine's Popular Charts. In January 2016, Quinn XCII featured on Ayokay's own single titled "Kings of Summer" which soared to #1 on the Spotify Global Viral Chart where it stayed there for three consecutive weeks, in addition to 25 million streams on Spotify. His collaboration with producer Illenium on a track titled "With You" reached #1 on the HypeMachine Popular Chart and reached #20 on the Spotify Global Viral Chart.

Quinn XCII released his highly anticipated second EP titled Bloom on March 10, 2016. Shortly after releasing the EP, Quinn XCII went on his first nationwide tour where he performed in 24 cities for over 20,000 fans.

2016–2018: The Story of Us
On December 9, 2016, Quinn XCII released his new single "Straightjacket", taken off of his upcoming debut album The Story of Us. A non-album single was released titled "Make Time", succeeded by two singles from the album that were released preceding the album's release in 2017, "Fake Denim" and "Worst". The Story of Us was released on September 15, 2017 under Columbia Records. A deluxe edition of the album was released on February 16, 2018, supported by the new single "Iron & Steel".

In April 2018, it was announced that Quinn XCII was added to the management roster of Visionary Music Group through a partnership with his manager Jesse Coren.

2018–2020: From Michigan with Love
Quinn XCII released his first single since A Story of Us titled "Panama" on August 22, 2018, on the music-sharing website SoundCloud. He wrote the song in honor of his four late grandparents, and was later released on all platforms on August 29.

On October 23, 2018, Quinn XCII announced a new upcoming single titled "Werewolf" featuring Yoshi Flower, and was released two days later on October 25. A week later, he released another single "Sad Still" on November 1, centered around the struggles and feelings of dealing with anxiety. He soon announced his second album titled From Michigan with Love via social media on November 5, 2018, which contains the latter two singles. The album was teased for an early 2019 release date. On December 11, 2018, Quinn XCII announced the third single off the album, titled "Tough" featuring Noah Kahan, and was released on December 14.

On November 6, 2018, Quinn XCII announced his worldwide 2019 tour for From Michigan with Love, titled "From Tour with Love". The tour includes shows at 8 cities in Europe and then 30 cities in North America with Christian French and Ashe co-headlining the tour. The tour kicks off in Amsterdam, the Netherlands on February 3, and then the North American leg on February 19 in Indianapolis, Indiana and ends on April 17 in Austin, Texas.

Quinn XCII announced via social media on January 7, 2019 that From Michigan with Love is set to be released on February 15. On February 15, it was released with 12 songs.

Quinn XCII teased his new single "Stacy" on June 18, 2019 on Twitter. The single was released that week on June 21, 2019.

2020: A Letter to My Younger Self 
On January 10, 2020, he released a single titled "Two 10s".

On April 27, 2020 Quinn XCII announced his third studio album A Letter to My Younger Self, inspired by a lifetime of events and experiences. It was released on July 10, 2020. On April 28, 2020 he teased his new single titled "Coffee" with Marc E. Bassy that was released on Friday, May 1, 2020.

2021: Change of Scenery II
Quinn XCII released his fourth studio album on March 5, 2021. Abandoning his residence in Los Angeles, the album was produced at ayokay’s family home in Rhode Island. He released two singles ahead of the release, "Stay Next to Me (with Chelsea Cutler)" and "My Wife & 2 Dogs"

2023: The People’s Champ
On January 27, 2023, Quinn XCII released his fifth studio album, entitled The People’s Champ, via a deal with Republic Records. The album was supported by four singles ahead of the release, "Backpack", "Common (featuring Big Sean)", “Let Me Down (with Chelsea Cutler), and "The Lows".

Style
Quinn XCII has been known to blend several different genres of music, including hip-hop, pop, reggae, rock, electronic and soul. His early music had him focused more on rapping than singing. He has listed Kid Cudi, Kanye West, Mos Def, Jack Johnson, Jon Bellion, Michael Jackson, Sam Cooke, and Chance the Rapper as artists who have influenced him.

Discography

Studio albums

Extended plays

Singles

As lead artist

As featured artist

Other charted and certified songs

Guest appearances

Awards and nominations 

!
|-
|align=center|2020
|From Michigan, With Love
|Detroit Music Award for Outstanding Major Label Recording
|
|
|-

References

1992 births
Living people
Singers from Detroit
Columbia Records artists
21st-century American singers
21st-century American male singers